A Multi-Purpose Logistics Module (MPLM) is a large pressurized container that was used on Space Shuttle missions to transfer cargo to and from the International Space Station (ISS).  Two MPLMs made a dozen trips in the Shuttle cargo bay and initially berthed to the Unity module and later the Harmony module on the ISS.  From there, supplies were offloaded, and finished experiments and waste were reloaded.  The MPLM was then reberthed in the Shuttle for return to Earth.  Three modules were built by the Italian Space Agency (ASI): Leonardo, Raffaello, and Donatello.

The Leonardo module was modified in 2010 to turn it into the Permanent Multipurpose Module (PMM) and was permanently attached to the ISS during the STS-133 mission in March 2011.  In July 2011, the Raffaello module was the primary payload on the final Space Shuttle mission.  It returned with the Shuttle and was stored at the Kennedy Space Center.  The Donatello module never launched.

MPLMs were flown on 12 of the 37 Space Shuttle missions to the ISS.

History
The modules were provided to NASA under contract by the Italian Space Agency (ASI). Three MPLMs were built and delivered to NASA and have names chosen by the ASI to denote some of the great talents in Italian history: Leonardo da Vinci, Raffaello and Donatello. Although built by ASI, the modules are owned by NASA. In exchange for building the MPLMs, ASI receives access to U.S. research time on the ISS.

The MPLMs have a heritage that goes back to Spacelab. In addition, ESA's Columbus module, the Harmony and Tranquility ISS modules and the ATV and Cygnus resupply craft all trace their origins to the MPLMs. The MPLM concept was originally created for Space Station Freedom. Initially, they were to be built by Boeing, but in 1992, the Italians announced that they would build a "Mini-Pressurized Logistics Module", able to carry  of cargo. After the 1993 redesign of Freedom, the length was doubled and it was renamed the "Multi-Purpose Logistics Module".

Donatello was a more capable module than its two siblings, as it was designed to carry payloads that required continuous power from construction through to installation on the ISS.  However, Donatello was never used and some of its parts were cannibalized to convert Leonardo into the PMM.

With the end of the Space Shuttle program in 2011, the Raffaello and Leonardo modules were flown a combined total of 12 times.

Design
An MPLM is a large cylinder equipped with a common berthing mechanism at one end, and grapple fixtures to allow the Canadarm-2 to move it from the shuttle bay to a berthing port on the US Orbital Segment of the ISS.

Power during launch

In order to provide power to equipment and experiments inside the MPLM during launch, the MPLM could be connected to the Shuttle's power supply by means of the Remotely Operated Electrical Umbilical (ROEU). The umbilical was mounted on the starboard side payload bay sidewall longeron, and was a folding arm umbilical that connected to the MPLM while it was in the payload bay. The arm was disconnected and retracted prior to the MPLM being removed for placement on the ISS and then reconnected once the MPLM was placed back inside the payload bay.

Program logo

Since the module names are also the names of three of the four Teenage Mutant Ninja Turtles, the NASA MPLM Group approached Mirage Studios artist A.C. Farley to design a logo featuring Raphael in an astronaut flight suit. There were cloisonné pins produced, as well as stickers and embroidered patches. Because the Ninja Turtles were created by Mirage Studios and owned by them at the time, NASA gave Mirage the copyright to the logo in exchange for the use of the studio's character on it.

Missions

Specifications 
The following are the specifications of the MPLM:
Length – 6.6 m (cylindrical part 4.8 m)
Width – 4.57 m
Mass – 4,082 kg empty; 13,154 kg fully loaded
Habitable volume – 31 m3
Material – stainless steel

Future use 
The Donatello MPLM has been converted by Lockheed Martin into a Habitat Ground Test Article (HGTA) Lunar habitat prototype which is located at NASA KSC. Leonardo is permanently attached to the ISS as PMM and should reenter in the atmosphere with it. Raffaello remains in storage at the Space Station Processing Facility.

Axiom Space plans to use a Multi-Purpose module for the Axiom Commercial Space Station.

See also 
 Automated Transfer Vehicle
 List of Space Shuttle missions

References 

Italian Space Agency
Supply vehicles for the International Space Station
Vehicles introduced in 2001